Madagascar: Escape 2 Africa (Music from the Motion Picture) is the soundtrack album to the 2008 film Madagascar: Escape 2 Africa, the second instalment in the Madagascar franchise. Released on November 4, 2008 by Interscope Records, the album featured original score composed by Hans Zimmer, who teamed up with American rapper will.i.am to produce the songs and score. will.i.am also wrote five new songs specifically for the film, while other incorporated songs were included in the film's soundtrack. The music received generally favorable critical response.

Development 
Hans Zimmer collaborated with American rapper will.i.am to produce the score and songs for Escape 2 Africa. To record for the film, Zimmer and will.i.am, had travelled to Africa (where the film was set) for the musical ideas and collaborated with the African musicians on the album. In the process, they had written four songs together for the film. While writing the track "The Travelling Song", will.i.am felt that "It’s about being stripped away from your home, and not knowing really where you come from. But wherever you are — because of your friends — that is your home now. Those lyrics really sum up my life, a black guy in a Mexican neighborhood, and apl.de.ap’s life, being placed for adoption at 14 and coming to America not knowing English. We made it our home because of our friendship, and that’s what ‘Madagascar’ is about." will.i.am also recorded his cover version of "I Like to Move It" in the end credits.

Track listing

Reception 
Filmtracks.com wrote "Madagascar: Escape 2 Africa remains the best entry for the infectiously cute main escape theme. In an ideal world, the best score material from all three films would be combined into one rollicking album." Andrew Leahey of AllMusic wrote "The Madagascar series relies heavily on music, often injecting songs directly into the movies' plot lines, and that emphasis helps fine-tune this soundtrack into a lighthearted, pleasant album." In contrast, Jonathan Broxton gave a negative review, calling it as the "worst soundtrack written for any major animated film of recent years".

Chart performance

Personnel 
Credits adapted from AllMusic.

 Ryeland Allison – arranger
 Gretchen Anderson – producer
 Slamm Andrews – music editor, recording
 Lorne Balfe – additional music
 Chris Barrett – scoring engineer
 John Barrett – scoring engineer
 Becky Bentham – score coordinator
 Jeff "Bucko" Biggers – recording
 Thomas Broderick – technical engineer
 Julie Butchko – music clearance
 Dan Butler – music business affairs
 Carmen Carter – vocals
 Alvin Chea – vocals
 Al Clay – recording, vocals
 Jim Dooley – additional music
 Dylan Dresdow – mixing
 Fred Ebb – composer
 Jack Feldman – composer
 Mark Ford – choir conductor
 Geoff Foster – scoring recordist
 Gavin Greenaway – score conductor
 Isobel Griffiths – orchestra contractor
 Richard Harvey – woodwind
 Rand Hoffman – music business affairs
 Luis Jardim – percussion
 John Kander – composer
 Andrew Kawczynski –technical assistance
 Steven Kofsky – music production supervisor
 Kaita Lewin – recording
 Abie Lister – score assistance
 Barry Manilow – composer, vocals
 Craig Marshall – music business affairs
 Liz McNicoll – music business affairs
 Alan Meyerson – mixing
 Perry Montague-Mason – orchestra Leader
 Erick "More" Morillo – composer
 Ennio Morricone – composer
 Wendi Morris – score coordinator
 Phil Orescan – marketing
 Sunny Park – executive in charge of music
 Heitor Pereira – composer, vocals
 Lori Perry – vocals
 Sharon Perry – vocals
 Purcell Singers – choir/chorus
 Mark Quashie – composer
 Frank Ricotti – marimba
 Ryan Rubin – assistant music editor
 Czarina Russell – studio manager
 Jennifer Schiller – music coordinator
 Tom Scholz – composer
 Tony Seyler – music business affairs
 Jacob Shea – arranger
 Ken "Kaz" Smith – music soordinator
 Peter Oso Snell – technical engineer
 Bruce Sussman – composer
 Louie Teran – mastering
 Vin Villanueva – music coordinator
 Greg Vines – mixing Assistant
 Matt Ward – recording
 Oren Waters – vocals
 Lucy Whalley – orchestra assembly
 Mark Wherry – digital processing
 will.i.am – composer, engineer, soundtrack producer, vocals
 Andrew Zack – score coordinator
 Geoff Zanelli – additional music
 Ianthe Zevos – creative consultant
 Hans Zimmer – composer, soundtrack producer

References 

2008 soundtrack albums
Hans Zimmer soundtracks
Will.i.am albums
Albums produced by will.i.am
Madagascar (franchise)
Pop soundtracks
Rock soundtracks
Rhythm and blues soundtracks
Interscope Records soundtracks